Hammer of God (2008) by Karen Miller. Following Empress of Mijak and The Riven Kingdom, it concludes the Godspeaker trilogy.

Plot introduction 
Empress Hekat hears the voice of the god, and it wants the world. In Ethrea, Queen Rhian is finally on the throne, she must convince her counterparts of surrounding nations that Mijak is a very real threat. Should she trust Zandakar, the exiled son of Mijak's Empress?

2008 Australian novels
Australian fantasy novels
Novels by Karen Miller
HarperCollins books